John Pasmore (by 1505–44), of Sutton in Halberton, Devon and Lions Inn, London, was an English lawyer and Member of Parliament.

He was a Member (MP) of the Parliament of England for Exeter in 1542.

References

Year of birth unknown
1544 deaths
English MPs 1542–1544
Members of the Parliament of England (pre-1707) for Exeter